Russia sent a delegation to compete at the 2010 Winter Paralympics in Vancouver, Canada. The country fielded thirty-two athletes in cross-country skiing, biathlon, and alpine skiing. Russia placed second in the final medal standings, though first in the total medal count, winning thirty-eight medals.

The Moscow Times noted the irony in the fact that there had been high hope for Russia's Winter Olympians, while fairly little attention had been paid to its Paralympians, until their performance stood out with a crop of medals. While the Moscow Times focused on the difficulties faced by the country's Paralympians in their everyday life, however, the Vancouver Sun remarked: "Unlike Canada and other countries where almost all Paralympians must have jobs, Team Russia's competitors are akin to 'sports professionals'. Most don't work so they can focus solely on their training, which is funded by the state and individual sponsors".
With Sochi being the host city of the 2014 Winter Paralympics, a Russian segment was performed at the closing ceremony.

Medalists

Alpine skiing

Biathlon

Cross-country skiing

See also
Russia at the 2010 Winter Olympics

References

External links
Vancouver 2010 Paralympic Games official website 
International Paralympic Committee official website

Nations at the 2010 Winter Paralympics
2010
Paralympics